Stickin' to My Guns is a studio album by Etta James, released in 1990. It was nominated for a Grammy for "Best Contemporary Blues Recording".

Production
The album contains a duet with rapper Def Jef. Although it reunited her with several Muscle Shoals musicians, James later expressed ambivalence about the more electronic sound of the album. Stickin' to My Guns was produced by Barry Beckett.

Critical reception
Rolling Stone called the album "a nonstop dance party filled with house rockers like 'Love to Burn' and turn-the-lights-down-low, slow-grind numbers like 'Your Good Thing (Is About to End)'." MusicHound Rock: The Essential Album Guide deemed it "a largely unsuccessful attempt to incorporate rap and hip-hop into a more traditional R&B context." The New York Times called it "the best album Aretha Franklin never made, as Ms. James belts out songs about lovers and deceivers."

Track listing

Personnel
Etta James - lead vocals
Barry Beckett - keyboards
Gary Burnette - acoustic guitar
Thomas Cain - backing vocals
Carol Chase - backing vocals
Ashley Cleveland - backing vocals
Def Jef - backing vocals
Quitman Dennis - trombone
Brother Gene Dinwiddie - tenor saxophone
Greg Donerson - percussion
Dobie Gray - backing vocals
Jack Hale - trombone
Roger Hawkins - drums
Mike Haynes - trumpet
Teenie Hodges - acoustic guitar
Jim Horn - baritone saxophone
Mike Lawler - synthesizer
Carl Marsh - programming, synthesizer
Arik Marshall - electric guitar
John Dewey McKnight - trombone
Jonell Mosser - backing vocals
Leo Nocentelli - electric guitar
David Patterson - baritone saxophone, tenor saxophone
Jim Pugh - keyboards, piano
Fernando Pullum - trumpet
Danny Rhodes - acoustic guitar
Michael Rhodes - bass guitar
Josh Sklair - acoustic guitar
Bobby Vega - bass guitar
Jimmie Wood - harmonica
Reggie Young - electric guitar

References

1990 albums
Etta James albums
Funk rock albums by American artists
Albums produced by Barry Beckett
Island Records albums